{{DISPLAYTITLE:C19H14O6}}
The molecular formula C19H14O6 (molar mass: 338.31 g/mol, exact mass: 338.0790 u) may refer to:

 Landomycinone
 Ustalic acid